Voicu is a Romanian surname derived from the Turkic (or Bajiq or Bayk) whose meaning is "True Man" or "rich, powerful," most likely through Slavic (from Vojko) mediation. Notable people with this surname include:

Adrian Voicu (Q111524276) (born 1970), Romanian writer
Adrian Voicu (born 1992), Romanian footballer
Andreea Voicu (born 1996), Romanian footballer
Angelo Voicu (1897–1932), Bulgarian poet
Bogdan Voicu (born 1981), former Romanian rugby union football player
Carmen Voicu-Jagodzinsky (née Voicu; born 1981), Romanian chess master
Cătălin Voicu (born 1965), Romanian politician
Elena Voicu (born 1990), Romanian handballer
Gheorghe Voicu (born 1950), Romanian former biathlete
Ioana Voicu (born 1972), Romanian former diver
Ion Voicu (1923–1997), Romanian violinist and conductor
Ion Voicu (footballer) (born 1975), Romanian former footballer
Ionuț Voicu (born 1984), Romanian footballer
Irinel Voicu (born 1977), Romanian former footballer
Mădălin Voicu (born 1952), Romanian musician and politician
Mircea Voicu (born 1980), Romanian former footballer
Nicolae Voicu (born 1955), Romanian former middle-distance runner
Pavel Voicu (born 1973), Moldovan politician

Voicu is also the given name attributed by the Romanian historiography to the father of John Hunyadi, who is called "Voyk" in Latin-language 15th century documents.

See also 
 Voina (disambiguation)
 Voinea
 Voineasa (disambiguation)
 Voinești (disambiguation)

References

Romanian-language surnames